The Tri-Valley Herald was a newspaper in the town of Livermore, California. Floyd L. Sparks was the longtime owner of the Herald, along with the Daily Review and The Argus. Sparks sold the papers in 1985 to the Bay Area News Group-East Bay (BANG-EB), a subsidiary of MediaNews Group.

The last issue of the paper was published on November 1, 2011, after which the paper was consolidated with the BANG-EB papers Contra Costa Times, Valley Times, San Ramon Valley Times, East County Times, and San Joaquin Herald under the new name Tri-Valley Times, a localized edition of The Mercury News.

References

External links
 Official site

Mass media in Alameda County, California
MediaNews Group publications
Newspapers published in the San Francisco Bay Area
Pleasanton, California